Numerous journalists have been murdered or killed in the United States while reporting, covering a military conflict, or because of their status as a journalist. At least 39 of these have been directly targeted as a result of their journalistic investigations.

The most dangerous sector of the US media after 1980 has been the race and ethnic press.  According to the Committee to Protect Journalists, ten journalists serving the Vietnamese, Haitian and Chinese immigrant communities were killed in political assassinations between 1980 and 1993. Chauncey Bailey, who was the editor at a large circulation African American newspaper, was murdered in 2007 for his investigative reporting.

Since the September 11 attacks, terrorism-related deaths involving journalists is another trend.

In some cases, journalists have been attacked but survived, such as Victor Riesel.

List

Other journalists and media workers killed on 9/11
The only professional, working journalist to die while covering the September 11 terrorist attacks on the World Trade Center in New York City was photojournalist Bill Biggart, who was killed by falling debris as he was taking photographs. However, the International Federation of Journalists, which also counts media workers, said that six other media workers and a journalist who were not working at the time died in the attacks. Among those media workers listed as killed were six broadcast TV engineers, who worked inside a tower, and another professional photojournalist, who was a passenger on the first plane that was flown into the WTC.

 Rod Coppola, TV engineer for WNET-TV, WTC (North Tower)
 Donald DiFranco, TV engineer for WABC-TV, WTC (North Tower) 
 Steve Jacobson, TV engineer for WPIX-TV, WTC (North Tower) 
 Bob Pattison, TV engineer for WCBS-TV, WTC (North Tower)
 Thomas Pecorelli, professional freelance photojournalist, American Airlines Flight 11 passenger
 Isias Rivera, TV engineer for WCBS-TV, WTC (North Tower)
 William Steckman, TV engineer for WNBC-TV, WTC (North Tower)

Gallery

See also
 Censorship in the United States

References

 
Murder in the United States
Journalists killed
United States
Lists of victims of crimes
United States crime-related lists
Censorship in the United States
Human rights in the United States